"Japanese Boy" is a hit single by Scottish singer Aneka, released in July 1981. The song became her highest-charting release, reaching number one in several countries, including the United Kingdom. The song's success would eventually lead audiences to associate Aneka closely with both the lyrics' subject matter as well as the kimono that she wore during some televised performances of the song, associations that she found difficult to discard as her career proceeded.

Background
Written by Bob Heatlie and produced by Neil Ross, the song was recorded by Scottish folk singer Mary Sandeman. Before then, Heatlie and Sandeman had worked together on several Scottish folk albums. Eventually, Sandeman told Heatlie that she wanted to sing a pop song, but he was reluctant to write something for her because she did not possess the qualities of a pop musician. Despite constant reminders, he forgot to write a song. One day, Sandeman called him to let him know that she had set up an appointment to record her new song, which Heatlie had not written yet. Working quickly, he wrote the chorus first, then stitched together several lyrics from songs he had previously composed.

After recording the demo for "Japanese Boy", Germany's Hansa Records agreed to release the single after multiple rejections. Heatlie and Sandeman began to work on Sandeman's image, dressing her in a wig and kimono. Realising that her name did not fit the song, she and Heatlie decided to come up with a name to put to the single. Leafing through the telephone directory, they came upon the name of Anika, changing the middle letter to "e" for Sandeman's stage name. Following its release, the song became a hit when it eventually reached No. 1 on the UK Singles Chart in August 1981. The song went on to become a hit all over Europe and beyond, although according to Sandeman, it failed to chart in Japan because, according to the Japanese office of Hansa, the song "sounded too Chinese."

The success of the single proved to be a problem, as Sandeman was left with a dilemma of what to do as a follow-up, now that her image was so firmly associated with one song. She modified her image and kept the Aneka name, but future single releases failed to chart highly in the UK, although she did score two follow-up hits in many countries in Europe.

The song was released on 7-inch vinyl and as an extended 12-inch vinyl version and featured on Aneka's debut – and only – album, released later in 1981. "Japanese Boy" sold almost half a million copies in the UK, making it one of the best-selling singles of 1981, and the second-best seller by a solo female artist (behind Kim Wilde's "Kids in America").

Sandeman featured in a 2006 Channel 4 documentary titled Bring Back the One Hit Wonders. Justin Lee Collins attempted to organise a one-off performance of as many one hit wonders as possible but despite getting in touch with Sandeman, she declined to take part as she did not want to travel to London from her home in Scotland and had "no desire" to perform the song.

Charts

Weekly charts

Year-end charts

See also
List of number-one singles of 1981 (Ireland) 
List of number-one singles and albums in Sweden
List of number-one singles of the 1980s (Switzerland)
List of UK Singles Chart number ones of the 1980s

References

1981 debut singles
1981 songs
Disco songs
Irish Singles Chart number-one singles
UK Singles Chart number-one singles
European Hot 100 Singles number-one singles
Ultratop 50 Singles (Flanders) number-one singles
Hansa Records singles
Elektra Records singles
British new wave songs
Number-one singles in Finland
Number-one singles in Sweden
Number-one singles in Switzerland
Sahara Hotnights songs
Japan in non-Japanese culture
Songs written by Bob Heatlie